The Greek Catholic Apostolic Exarchate of Istanbul (or of Constantinople) (Exarchatus Apostolicus Constantinopolitanus) is the senior of two missionary pre-diocesan Eastern Catholic jurisdictions that constitute the Greek Byzantine Catholic Church, an Eastern Catholic Church of the Byzantine Rite in the Greek language.

It is directly subject to the Holy See, as the Greek Catholic Church, does not have a metropolitan. The Apostolic Exarchate covers all territory of Turkey. Its cathedral episcopal see is the Ayatriada Rum Katoliki Kilise (Holy Trinity Rum Catholic Church) in Istanbul.  As of 2017, it was the sole parish of the exarchate and has 16 parishioners.

History 
The first steps toward creating a particular jurisdiction for Greek Catholics of the Byzantine Rite in the European part of the Ottoman Empire were made in 1907, when Greek Catholic priest Isaias Papadopoulos was made vicar general for the Greek Catholics within the jurisdiction of the Apostolic Delegation of Constantinople.

The Greek Catholic Apostolic Exarchate of Constantinople (Istanbul) was founded on June 11, 1911, as the Greek Catholic Apostolic Exarchate of European Turkey. At the same time, on June 28 (1911), Isaias Papadopoulos was appointed titular bishop of Gratianopolis, and he was also entrusted with the initial organization of the newly formed Exarchate, but he was not appointed apostolic exarch. That question had to be postponed because of the breakout of Balkan Wars (1912-1913) when the Ottoman Empire lost most of its European territory, and the consequent breakout of First World War (1914-1918). The first apostolic exarch, George Calavassy, was appointed only after the war, in 1920.

On June 11, 1932, it lost territory to establish the Greek Catholic Apostolic Exarchate of Greece. In 1936, it was renamed as Apostolic Exarchate of Istanbul or of Constantinople. On November 25, 1999, Bishop Louis Pelâtre, A.A., Apostolic Vicar of the Roman Catholic Apostolic Vicariate of Istanbul, was named apostolic administrator of the exarchate. On April 16, 2016, Fr. Rubén Tierrablanca Gonzalez, O.F.M, was named administrator of the exarchate, with the retirement of Bishop Pelâtre. He also holds the office of Apostolic Vicar of Istanbul.

Ordinaries 
 George Calavassy, Apostolic Exarch of Constantinople (July 13, 1920 – June 11, 1932), Titular Bishop of Theodoropolis of the Greeks; later Apostolic Exarch of Greek Catholic Apostolic Exarchate of Greece (Greece) (June 11, 1932 – November 7, 1957)
 Dionisio Leonida Varouhas, Apostolic Exarch of Constantinople (June 11, 1932 – death January 28, 1957), Titular Bishop of Gratianopolis;
 Domenico Caloyera, O.P., as Apostolic Administrator 'sede plena' (May 27, 1955 –  January 28, 1957), next Apostolic Administrator 'sede vacante' (1957.01.28 – 1976); later Metropolitan Archbishop of Izmir (Turkey) (1978.12.07 – 1983.01.22)
 Louis Pelâtre, A.A., Apostolic Administrator (November 25, 1999 – 2016), Titular Bishop of Sasima (since July 9, 1992), Apostolic Vicar of Istanbul (Turkey) (July 9, 1992 – 2016), President of Episcopal Conference of Turkey (1995–2001), Apostolic Administrator (November 25, 1996 – 2016)
 Rubén Tierrablanca Gonzalez, O.F.M., Apostolic Administrator (April 16, 2016 – December 22, 2020), titular Bishop of Tubernuca
 Lorenzo Piretto, O.P., Apostolic Administrator (December 24, 2020-13 Sep 2021)
 Massimiliano Palinuro, Apostolic Administrator (14 Sep 2021 – present)

See also 
 Catholic Church in Turkey
 Bulgarian Catholic Apostolic Vicariate of Istanbul
 Greek Catholic Church of Nazareth

References

Sources

External links
 Catholic Hierarchy: Apostolic Exarchate of Istanbul (Constantinople) 
 Catholic Hierarchy: Apostolic Exarchate of Greece (Greek) 
 Catholic Hierarchy: Georges Calavassy 
 Catholic Hierarchy: Denis Leonid Varouhas 
 Catholic Hierarchy: Domenico Caloyera 
 Catholic Hierarchy: Louis Pelâtre 
 Catholic Hierarchy: Rubén Tierrablanca Gonzalez 
 Unofficial Home Page of the Society of St. John Chrysostom of Ayatriada Rum Katoliki Kilise, Istanbul

Greek Byzantine Catholic Church
Apostolic exarchates
Eastern Catholic dioceses in Turkey
Catholic Church in Turkey
Christianity in Istanbul